Ion 'Jon' Erice Domínguez (born 3 November 1986) is a Spanish professional footballer who plays for UD Mutilvera as a midfielder.

Club career
Erice was born in Pamplona, Navarre. A CA Osasuna youth graduate, he appeared in a total of nine first-team games in his first two seasons, the first coming on 1 April 2007 in a 0–0 La Liga home draw against Sevilla FC (90 minutes played). He finished the following campaign on loan to Segunda División's Málaga CF, contributing five matches to the Andalusia side's top-flight return.

In 2008–09 Erice was loaned again, now to SD Huesca, newly promoted to the second division. He was released in January 2009, signing a one and a half-year contract with Segunda División B club Cádiz CF although a loan was initially projected, making ten appearances for another promotion.

Erice was an undisputed starter throughout the 2009–10 season – 36 games, 2,696 minutes – but Cádiz were immediately relegated after finishing 19th. After returning to the second tier with Real Oviedo in 2015, he terminated his contract after four years at the Estadio Carlos Tartiere, two of them as team captain; one month before, he faced a supporter in one of the most populous streets in Oviedo.

On 2 August 2017, Erice signed a two-year deal with fellow division two side Albacete Balompié. The 32-year-old moved to the Major League Soccer's Vancouver Whitecaps FC on 22 January 2019, parting by mutual consent one year later before the start of the new season and immediately returning to his previous club on a six-month deal.

Honours
Oviedo
Segunda División B: 2014–15

References

External links

Stats and bio at Cadistas1910 

1986 births
Living people
Footballers from Pamplona
Spanish footballers
Association football midfielders
La Liga players
Segunda División players
Segunda División B players
Segunda Federación players
CA Osasuna B players
CA Osasuna players
Málaga CF players
SD Huesca footballers
Cádiz CF players
CD Guadalajara (Spain) footballers
Real Oviedo players
Albacete Balompié players
Hércules CF players
Cypriot First Division players
Apollon Limassol FC players
Super League Greece players
A.O. Kerkyra players
Major League Soccer players
Vancouver Whitecaps FC players
Spanish expatriate footballers
Expatriate footballers in Cyprus
Expatriate footballers in Greece
Expatriate soccer players in Canada
Spanish expatriate sportspeople in Cyprus
Spanish expatriate sportspeople in Greece
Spanish expatriate sportspeople in Canada